What or WHAT may refer to:

 What, an interrogative pronoun and adverb
 "What?", one of the Five Ws used in journalism

Film and television
 What! (film) or The Whip and the Body, a 1963 Italian film directed by Mario Bava
  What? (film), a 1972 film directed by Roman Polanski
 "What", the name of the second baseman in Abbott and Costello's comedy routine "Who's on First?"
 "What?", the catchphrase of professional wrestler Stone Cold Steve Austin

Music
 what., a comedy/music album by Bo Burnham, 2013
 What Records, a UK record label
 What? Records, a US record label

Songs
 "What" (song), by Melinda Marx, 1965
 "What?" (Rob Zombie song), 2009
 "What?" (SB19 song), 2021
 "What?", by 666 from The Soft Boys
 "What", by Bassnectar from Vava Voom
 "What?", by Corrosion of Conformity from Eye for an Eye
 "What?", by the Move from Looking On
 "What?", by A Tribe Called Quest from The Low-End Theory

Science and technology
 Web Hypertext Application Technology
 What.CD, a private music tracker website for BitTorrent users.
 What (ITS utility), a small information utility in the Incompatible Timesharing System
 WhatsApp, cross-platform messaging and Voice over IP service owned by Facebook

Other uses
 WHAT (AM), a radio station in Philadelphia, Pennsylvania, US
 Winter Haven Area Transit, a transit system in Florida, US

See also
 Wat (disambiguation)
 Watt (disambiguation)
 WUT (disambiguation)
 Que (disambiguation)